Ez-Zitouna University is a public ancient medieval university in Tunis, Tunisia. The university originates in the Al-Zaytuna Mosque, founded at the end of the 7th century or in the early 8th century, which developed into a major Islamic centre of learning in North Africa. It consists of the Higher Institute of Theology and the Higher Institute of Islamic Civilisation in Tunis and a research institution, the Center of Islamic Studies, in Kairouan.

History

There is little information about teaching at the Zaytuna Mosque prior to the 14th century. During this time there were most likely courses being offered voluntarily by ulama (Islamic legal scholars), but not in an organized manner. For centuries, Kairouan was the early centre of learning and intellectual pursuits in Tunisia and North Africa in general. Starting from the 13th century, Tunis became the capital of Ifriqiya under Almohad and Hafsid rule. This shift in power helped al-Zaytuna to flourish and become one of the major centres of Islamic learning, and Ibn Khaldun, the first social historian in history was one of its products. The flourishing university attracted students and men of learning from all parts of the known world at the time. Along with disciplines of theology – such as exegesis of the Qur'an (tafsir) – the university taught fiqh (Islamic jurisprudence), Arabic grammar, history, science and medicine. It also had a kuttab, or elementary school, that taught youth how to read, write, and memorize religious texts. The system of teaching was not rigid: attendance was not mandatory and students could follow the courses of their choice. Students who followed a course and became knowledgeable enough to teach the subject on their own were granted a certificate called an ijazah by their instructor.

Rich libraries were also attached to the university. The manuscripts covered almost all subjects and sciences, including grammar, logic, documentations, etiquette of research, cosmology, arithmetic, geometry, minerals, vocational training, etc. One of its famous libraries, al-Abdaliyah, included a large collection of rare manuscripts that attracted scholars from abroad. Much of the library's original collection was dispersed or destroyed when the Spanish occupied Tunis and broke into the Zaytuna Mosque in 1534. 

Administrative and curricular reforms to the institution were begun by Ahmad Bey in 1842. They continued in 1875 under Prime Minister Khayr al-Din al-Tunisi, who also expanded the al-Abdaliyah Library and opened it to the public. In 1896 new courses were introduced such as physics, political economy, and French, and in 1912 these reforms were extended to the university's other branches in Kairouan, Sousse, Tozeur, and Gafsa. Until the 20th century the students were mostly recruited from Tunisia's wealth families but afterwards its recruitment broadened. Under French colonial rule it turned into a bastion of Arab and Islamic culture resisting French influence. Some prominent members of the Algerian nationalist movement studied here, such as 'Abd al-Hamid ibn Badis, Tawfiq Madani, and Houari Boumédiène. The traditional pedagogy of the university opposed French influence in Tunisian culture, even though younger people who studied there and who were unable to attend other universities lost the concept of the university having prestige. The students, faculty, and alumni became an integral part of the 1920s Destour party.

Following Tunisia's Independence, the modern Zitouna University was established on April 26, 1956. Reforms to the education system in 1958 and the creation of the University of Tunis in 1960 reduced the Zitouna's importance. The university's library was also integrated into the National Libraries of Tunis. The Zitouna University was succeeded by the Zitouna Faculty of Shari’a and Theology on March 1, 1961 which became one of the components of University of Tunis. In 1964–1965 its status as an independent university was abolished by President Habib Bourguiba and it was relegated to being a theological college for the University of Tunis. For years afterward, under the rule of both Bourguiba and his successor Ben Ali, the educational institution was kept officially and physically distinct from the mosque itself. The Zitouna name was restored by Zine El Abidine Ben Ali in 1987, after having been changed under Bourguiba.

In 2012, after the Tunisian revolution and in response to a court petition by a group of Tunisian citizens, the mosque's former educational offices were reopened and it was declared as an independent educational institution once again.

Academics

The present-day institution has some 1200 students and 90 faculty, divided between two associated institutes — the Higher Institute of Theology and the Higher Institute of Islamic Civiliation in Tunis — and a research institution, the Center of Islamic Studies in Kairouan.

Lessons in the Higher Institute of Theology began in the academic year 1988/89. It awards
 Bachelor's degree in Shari'a and Islamic thought in Islamic Sciences
 Master in Islamic Sciences 
 Ph.D. in Islamic Sciences 
 Superior Technician in Applied Multimedia on Islamic Arts 
 Superior Technician in Arts of Islamic Heritage

The Higher Institute of Islamic Civilisation has some 300 students and 40 researchers. It awards
 National diploma of the first cycle in Islamic studies (D.E.U.P.C.) 
 National diploma of Masters in the Islamic studies

Faculties 
 Islamic studies and Islamic civilization  
 Islamic law  
 Theology

Notable alumni
Alumni include the scholar Ibn Khaldun, the trade unionist and writer Tahar Haddad, the politician and writer Abdelaziz Thâalbi, the Tunisian national poet Aboul-Qacem Echebbi, and Grand Muhaddis Imam Mufti Al Sayyid Fahal Bin Javaid Al Hassani (Beni Fatimeh).

References

Citations

Bibliography

External links 

 Higher Institute of Theology
 Higher Institute of Islamic Civilisation
 Center of Islamic Studies

 
Universities in Tunisia
Educational institutions established in the 8th century
University of Ez-Zitouna